The 2019 World Para Swimming Championships is the 2019 edition of the World Para Swimming Championships run by the International Paralympic Committee (IPC). The championships were held from February to June in seven countries across five continents and served as a qualifying event for Paralympic swimming at the 2020 Summer Paralympics. The event was sponsored by Allianz.

In 2017, the IPC announced that the event would be hosted in Kuching, Malaysia. However, on 27 January 2019, Malaysia were stripped of their hosting rights because their government refused to allow Israeli athletes into the country to compete.

On 15 April 2019, London, United Kingdom was announced as the new host for the championships, now rescheduled to take place from 9 - 15 September.

Host selection 
In September 2017, World Para Swimming (formerly IPC Swimming) granted hosting rights to Kuching, Malaysia, who prevailed over a bid from London in Great Britain. The award was made with the understanding that they would permit all qualified athletes to compete. In 2019, as part of a solidarity move with the Palestinian National Authority, Malaysia announced that they would ban Israeli athletes from entering the event in a move that was supported by 29 Malaysian non-governmental organizations. The Malaysian Paralympic Council said they were following a Malaysian government policy to bar Israelis from competition as Malaysia bans Israeli passport holders from entering the country. After a meeting held in London, the IPC decreed that this was a politically motivated exclusion and stripped Malaysia of their hosting rights. This came after an Israel Foreign Affairs Ministry statement saying the ban of Israeli athletes was "shameful and totally opposes the Olympic spirit".  Malaysian Prime Minister Mahathir Mohamad stood by the decision, calling Israel "a country which does not obey international laws" and said "I don't understand because the world has the power but still has to listen to Israel."

The IPC requested bids as stand-in hosts by 11 February. London was selected to host the championships at the Queen Elizabeth Park in April 2019.

Participating nations
637 swimmers from 73 nations participated.

 (10)
 (34)
 (4)
 (3)
 (12)
 (1)
 (26)
 (18)
 (3)
 (41)
 (1)
 (6)
 (5)
 (1)
 (8)
 (3)
 (1)
 (8)
 (1)
 (4)
 (5)
 (10)
 (1)
 (15)
 (24) Host nation
 (14)
 (1)
 (8)
 (8)
 (6)
 (1)
 (4)
 (3)
 (8)
 (9)
 (22)
 (14)
 (11)
 (2)
 (1)
 (1)
 (2)
 (5)
 (2)
 (1)
 (17)
 (1)
 (1)
 (1)
 (2)
 (11)
 (7)
 (1)
 (4)
 (1)
 (2)
 (2)
 (10)
 (9)
 (52)
 (1)
 (5)
 (1)
 (1)
 (7)
 (4)
 (37)
 (6)
 (3)
 (5)
 (8)
 (1)
 (43)
 (17)
 (7)

Events 
The series was held at venues in seven countries. Events commenced on 15 February in Melbourne, Australia. Further events were held in April in Indianapolis, São Paulo and Glasgow, in May in Singapore, in May and June in Lignano Sabbiadoro, and in Berlin on 9 June.

The championships served as one of the qualifying events for swimming at the 2020 Summer Paralympics in Tokyo, Japan.

Medal table 
The medals table as of day 7.

Broken records
A total of 188 records were broken during the Championships: 39 World records, 55 Championship records, 22 African and Oceanian records, 21 Asian records, 17 American records and 12 European records.

World records

Schedule 
Purple squares mark final heats scheduled.

Multi-medalists 
List of male and female multi-medalists who have won three gold medals or five medals.

Men

Women

See also 
 2019 World Para Athletics Championships
 Swimming at the 2020 Summer Paralympics

References 

 
World Para Swimming Championships
2019 in swimming
2019 in disability sport
Islam and antisemitism
World Para Swimming
2019 in English sport
International aquatics competitions hosted by the United Kingdom
Swimming competitions in the United Kingdom
Sports competitions in London
2019 sports events in London